The 2015–16 season is Valencia Club de Fútbol's 96th in the club's history and their 81st in La Liga. The club qualified for the UEFA Champions League for the first time since 2012–13. They began in the play-off round, where a win over Monaco saw them qualify for the group stages, where they competed in Group H, finishing third and dropping into the round of 32 of the UEFA Europa League. Valencia also competed in the Copa del Rey, entering at the round of 32 and being eliminated by Barcelona 8–1 on aggregate in the semi-finals.

Players

From the Youth Squad

Out on loan

Transfers

In

Total spending:  €128,000,000

Out

Total income:  €47,700,000

Total expenditure:  €80,300,000

Competitions

Overall

Overview

La Liga

League table

Results summary

Results by round

Matches

Copa del Rey

Round of 32

Round of 16

Quarter-finals

Semi-finals

UEFA Champions League

Play-off round

Group stage

UEFA Europa League

Knockout phase

Round of 32

Round of 16

Statistics

Appearances and goals
Last updated on 15 May 2016

|-
! colspan=14 style=background:#dcdcdc; text-align:center|Goalkeepers

|-
! colspan=14 style=background:#dcdcdc; text-align:center|Defenders

|-
! colspan=14 style=background:#dcdcdc; text-align:center|Midfielders

|-
! colspan=14 style=background:#dcdcdc; text-align:center|Forwards

|-
! colspan=14 style=background:#dcdcdc; text-align:center| Players who have made an appearance or had a squad number this season but have been loaned out or transferred
|-

|-
|}

References

Valencia CF seasons
Valencia
Valencia